Butyrin is a Russian masculine surname originating from the word butro, meaning fat belly; its feminine counterpart is Butyrina. The surname may refer to the following notable people:

Sergei Butyrin (born 1987), Russian football player
Vitaly Butyrin (1947–2020), Soviet and Lithuanian photographer

See also
 Tributyrin, a chemical present in butter
Notarcha butyrina, a moth

References

Russian-language surnames